Dizzy Gillespie and Stuff Smith is an album by trumpeter Dizzy Gillespie and violinist Stuff Smith, recorded in 1957 and released on the Verve label.

Reception
The AllMusic review awarded the album 4.5 stars.

Track listing
 "Rio Pakistan" (Dizzy Gillespie) - 11:31   
 "It's Only a Paper Moon" (Harold Arlen, E. Y. Harburg, Billy Rose) - 8:28  
 "Purple Sounds" (Gillespie, Stuff Smith) - 10:08  
 "Russian Lullaby" (Irving Berlin) - 7:57  
 "Oh, Lady Be Good!" (George Gershwin, Ira Gershwin) - 4:11

Personnel
Dizzy Gillespie - trumpet
Stuff Smith - violin
Wynton Kelly - piano
Paul West - bass
J. C. Heard - drums
The Gordon Family: George Gordon, George Gordon Jr., Richard Gordon, Honey Gordon - vocal group (track 5)

References 

Dizzy Gillespie albums
Stuff Smith albums
1957 albums
Verve Records albums
Albums produced by Norman Granz